The Audi RS 3 LMS TCR is a racing car built according to the TCR rule system. It is based on the Audi RS 3 sedan. It has also undergone significant widening, as well as racing spoilers have been fitted to the car, as well as the appropriate roll-over tube inside the vehicle for the necessary safety. Its engine is a two-liter, four-cylinder, turbo engine. With 330 horsepower, it accelerates to 100 km/h in 4.5 seconds. It is somewhat similar in design to a modern DTM car, but the TCR series and the company's goal is customer-based racing with the model, i.e. series production with the models, so they were available at a favorable price compared to a racing car for 129,000 euros. In addition to the model with sequential transmission, Audi also sells to customers a race car with a DSG transmission, which is mostly used in long-distance endurance races.

Audi RS 3 LMS TCR (2021) 

After the release of 4th generation of Audi A3; the model of RS 3 LMS TCR is also changed, and it firstly started to race in 2021 WTCR season. Then, it also started to race in other TCR series.

Awards 
The first and second generation RS 3 LMS TCR won the TCR Model of the Year award in 2017 and 2021 respectively.

References

TCR cars
Cars introduced in 2016
Front-wheel-drive vehicles
RS 3 LMS TCR